Mastigoteuthis inermis is a species of whip-lash squid. Richard E. Young and Michael Vecchione consider it to be a junior synonym of the widely distributed M. magna.

References
Rancurel, P. 1972. Mastigoteuthis inermis espèce nouvelle de Chiroteuthidae du Golfe de Guinée (Cephalopoda - Oegopsida). Bulletin de la Société Zoologique de France 97(1): 25-34.

External links

Tree of Life web project: Mastigoteuthis inermis

Mastigoteuthis
Molluscs described in 1972